The 1997–98 National Professional Soccer League season was the fourteenth season for the league. Also marks the twentieth season of professional Division 1 indoor soccer.

League standings

American Conference

East Division

Central Division

National Conference

North Division

Midwest Division

Playoffs

Scoring leaders

GP = Games Played, G = Goals, A = Assists, Pts = Points

League awards
 Most Valuable Player: Victor Nogueira, Milwaukee
 Defender of the Year: Matt Knowles, Philadelphia
 Rookie of the Year: Travis Roy, Detroit
 Goalkeeper of the Year: Victor Nogueira, Milwaukee
 Coach of the Year: Keith Tozer, Milwaukee
 Playoffs MVP: Victor Nogueira, Milwaukee

All-NPSL Teams

All-NPSL Rookie Teams

References
Major Indoor Soccer League II (RSSSF)

1997 in American soccer leagues
1998 in American soccer leagues
1997 in Canadian soccer
1998 in Canadian soccer
1997-98